Roman Kruglyakov (or Krougliakov) is a Russian sprint canoeist who competed from the late 1990s to the early 2000s. He won six medals at the ICF Canoe Sprint World Championships with four golds (C-4 200 m: 1999, 2002, 2005; C-4 500 m: 1999), one silver (C-4 500 m: 2002), and one bronze (C-4 500 m: 2001).
  
Kruglyakov was stripped of two medals (both gold) at the 2003 ICF Canoe Sprint World Championships when his teammate Sergey Ulegin tested positive for doping.

References

Living people
Russian male canoeists
Year of birth missing (living people)
ICF Canoe Sprint World Championships medalists in Canadian